La Cittadella is a 1964 Italian miniseries based on A. J. Cronin's 1937 novel, The Citadel, and produced by Radiotelevisione Italiana.  It was directed by Anton Giulio Majano and stars Alberto Lupo as Dr. Manson and Anna Maria Guarnieri as his wife, Christine. Other television versions include an American (1960), another Italian (2003), and two British adaptations, 1960 and 1983.

Plot summary

Cast 
 Alberto Lupo as Andrew Manson
 Anna Maria Guarnieri  as Cristina Barlow
 Carlo Hintermann  as  Denny
 Laura Efrikian as  Mary Boland
 Eleonora Rossi Drago  as  Francis Lawrence
 Loretta Goggi  as Florrie
 Nando Gazzolo  as Freddie Hamson
 Lida Ferro as  Blodwen Page
 Aldo Silvani  as Prof. Abbey 
 Fosco Giachetti as Prof. Gadsby 
 Ferruccio De Ceresa  as  Stillman
 Mercedes Brignone  as Lady Gladys  
 Antonella Della Porta  as Margie 
 Gabriele Antonini  as Grenfell 
 Gianni Solaro  as Sutton 
 Mario Ferrari  as Avv. Boon  
 Luigi Pavese  as Con Boland 
 Nino Pavese  as Prof. Mc Donald 
 Guido Celano  as Russell

References

External links 
 
 Article about Cronin and the NHS

Italian drama television series
1964 Italian television series debuts
Television shows based on British novels
Period television series
Television shows based on works by A. J. Cronin
1960s Italian television series